Pavlova Huť is a nature reserve within the Český les Protected Landscape Area in the western part of the Plzeň Region of the Czech Republic. It is named after a former glass works village (founded around 1740, destroyed after 1945) of the same name which was located nearby. It lies along the boundary with Germany.

The reserve protects a well-preserved bog spruce forest with typical fauna and flora. 100% of the area is forested, mainly by spruce. It is one of few places in the Český les PLA where a spruce forest is native.

Pavlova Huť is also a Special Area of Conservation.

References

Nature reserves in the Czech Republic
Protected areas in Tachov District